Pammeces is a genus of moths in the family Agonoxenidae. It was formerly included in the Cosmopterigidae.

Species
Pammeces albivittella Zeller, 1863
Pammeces citraula Meyrick, 1922
Pammeces crocoxysta Meyrick, 1922
Pammeces lithochroma Walsingham, 1897
Pammeces pallida Walsingham, 1897
Pammeces phlogophora Walsingham, 1909
Pammeces picticornis (Walsingham, 1897)
Pammeces problema Walsingham, 1915

References
Natural History Museum Lepidoptera genus database

Agonoxeninae
Moth genera